The German Pro Championships was a major professional men's tennis tournament. There were similar competitions in other countries, and also the World Pro Championships. After 1945 other names were used like German International in 1951 and Berlin Pro Championships in 1952.

Singles

See also
Major professional tennis tournaments before the Open Era

References

Defunct tennis tournaments in Germany
Clay court tennis tournaments
Sports competitions in Berlin
Professional tennis tournaments before the Open Era